Tru Vu Entertainment is an entertainment company that streams live programs via their website. All of the programming on the site is audience interactive. Each show is hosted by a person called a Cyber Jockey (CJ). Internet viewers from around the world will watch the CJs and communicate instantaneously with them via typed comments flashed on a monitor in a studio.

History

IM2K
Tru Vu Entertainment initially began business in Nashville, Tennessee during October 1998 as IM2K (Internet Music 2000). The IM2K website was used as a beta test, and ran live for three weeks tallying more than 300,000 visits  amongst viewers before the website was taken down and the studio was deconstructed.

RAVE2000
The company relocated to Hudson, Florida and returned in October 2000 as RAVE2000 (Radio Audio Visual Entertainment). Starting with more than 200 CJs  RAVE2000 debuted, as a live music channel that played all genres. After one year, around the same time as the end of the Dot-com bubble, the website was once again put to an end.

Tru Vu Entertainment
In July 2010 the company relocated to McKeesport, Pennsylvania. Now named Tru Vu Entertainment, the company opened its doors at the former Immel's department store. Tru Vu Entertainment is using the former clothing store to build a number of studios. Tru Vu Entertainment plans to launch their new music channel in early 2011.

References

External links 
 Pittsburgh Post-Gazette
 Tru Vu Entertainment

Mass media companies of the United States